Carlos Lalanne (born 14 December 1906, date of death unknown) was a Chilean sports shooter. He competed in the 50 m pistol event at the 1936 Summer Olympics.

References

External links
 

1906 births
Year of death missing
Chilean male sport shooters
Olympic shooters of Chile
Shooters at the 1936 Summer Olympics
Place of birth missing
20th-century Chilean people